Magħtab is a village in Naxxar, Malta. Magħtab is mostly known for Malta's largest landfill. Since Malta joined the E.U in 2004, the landfill has been closed. Rehabilitation of the closed landfill is in progress.

The hill of Ġebel San Pietru is also located within the confines of Magħtab.

In December 2021, residents noticed new excavated rock and construction waste, forming a new 'waste mountain'.

References

Landfills
Nature conservation in Malta
Naxxar
Magħtab